Věšín is a municipality and village in Příbram District in the Central Bohemian Region of the Czech Republic. It has about 700 inhabitants.

Administrative parts
The village of Buková is an administrative part of Věšín.

References

Villages in Příbram District